Termination Bliss is the second album by the Swedish metal band Deathstars. It was released in 2006 on Nuclear Blast records.

Track listing

Personnel 
Whiplasher Bernadotte – vocals
Nightmare Industries – guitars, keyboards, electronics
Skinny Disco – bass
Bone W Machine – drums

Guest performer:
Ann Ekberg – female vocals (on "Tongues" and "Greatest Fight on Earth")

Production
Produced by Nightmare Industries.
Recorded by Nightmare Industries and Skinny at BlackSyndicate Studios, Stockholm
Mixed by Stefan Glaumann at ToyTown Studios, Stockholm
Mastered by Håkan Åkesson at Cutting Room, Stockholm

2006 albums
Deathstars albums